Forcing Out the Silence is the first EP by American art rock band Junius. It was originally released by Radar Recordings on January 1, 2004, but was later re-released on September 9, 2008 in its original packaging. The album was remastered for a 10th anniversary re-release on January 30, 2015.

Background
Following the release of Forcing Out the Silence, Junius immediately began touring, playing more than two hundred shows over the duration of around nine months. The band has toured frequently ever since.

Track listing

Personnel
Junius
Joseph E. Martinez - guitar, vocals
Michael Repasch-Nieves - guitar
Dave Soucy - bass
Dana Filloon - drums
Production
Will Benoit - production
Nick Zampiello - mastering

References

External links

2004 debut EPs
Junius (band) albums